Sikaripara Assembly constituency is an assembly constituency in  the Indian state of Jharkhand.

Overview
Sikaripara Assembly constituency covers: Sikaripara, Raneswar and Kathikund Police Stations in Dumka district.

This seat is reserved for Scheduled Tribes.

Sikaripara Assembly constituency is part of Dumka (Lok Sabha constituency).

Members of Legislative Assembly 
2000: Nalin Soren, Jharkhand Mukti Morcha
2005: Nalin Soren, Jharkhand Mukti Morcha
2009: Nalin Soren, Jharkhand Mukti Morcha
2014: Nalin Soren, Jharkhand Mukti Morcha
2019: Nalin Soren, Jharkhand Mukti Morcha

See also
 Shikaripara
 Ranishwar
 Kathikund

References

Assembly constituencies of Jharkhand